Stefan Edberg and Anders Järryd were the defending champions, but Järryd did not compete this year. Edberg teamed up with Henri Leconte and reached the quarterfinal round until were forced to withdraw.

Patrik Kühnen and Tore Meinecke won the title by defeating Magnus Gustafsson and Diego Nargiso 7–6, 7–6 in the final.

Seeds

Draw

Draw

References

External links
 Official results archive (ATP)
 Official results archive (ITF)

Doubles